Barisimu (also Romanized as Barīsīmū and Bereysemū; also known as Bagharsūn, Barīnsamū, Biraismūn, Bi’r-e-Samūn, Bīr Samūn, and Rīsī Jān) is a village in Howmeh Rural District, in the Central District of Bandar Lengeh County, Hormozgan Province, Iran. At the 2006 census, its population was 77, in 14 families.

References 

Populated places in Bandar Lengeh County